Stade Ameur El-Gargouri is a Tunisian football stadium with the capacity of 4,000.
It is in Sfax, Tunisie.
It is the stadium of 1977 FIFA World Youth Championship and Sfax Railways Sports.

Football venues in Tunisia